Wyoming Highway 112 (WYO 112) is a  state highway in north-central Crook County, Wyoming that runs from Hulett to the Montana-Wyoming State Line.

Route description 
Wyoming Highway 112 begins its south end at Wyoming Highway 24 in Hulett. From there WYO 112 travels north to Montana-Wyoming State Line. The highway continues north from there a short distance as Montana Secondary Highway 326 to meet US 212 in Alzada, Montana.

Major intersections

References

External links

Wyoming State Routes 100-199
WYO 112 - WYO 24 to MT 326/Montana State Line
Hulett, WY homepage

Transportation in Crook County, Wyoming
112